Ugalde is a Basque surname. Notable people with the surname include:

Antonio Ugalde (born 1976), Spanish handball player who competed in the 2000 Summer Olympics
Juan de Ugalde (1729–1816), commanding general of Texas, Coahuila, Nuevo León, and Nuevo Santander; also known as "Juan de Uvalde"
Luis Carlos Ugalde (born 1966), Mexican scholar who served as president of the Federal Electoral Institute from 2003 to 2007
Unax Ugalde (born 1978), Spanish actor born in Vitoria-Gasteiz, Álava, Spain, in the Basque country
Ana Bárbara (born Altagracia Ugalde Mota in 1971), Mexican singer-songwriter

Ugalde was also the surname of French singers
Delphine Ugalde (1829–1910)
Marguerite Ugalde (1862–1940)

See also

Estadio Carlos Ugalde Álvarez, multi-use stadium in Ciudad Quesada, Costa Rica
Thompson/Center Ugalde, a series of wildcat firearm cartridges
Uvalda, Georgia, a city in the U.S. state of Georgia
Uvalde, Texas, a city in the U.S. state of Texas
Uvalde County, Texas, a county in the U.S. state of Texas
Uvalde (disambiguation)

References

Basque-language surnames